Tanya Lacey (born 2 March 1986) is an English recording artist, songwriter and composer. She signed to the record label Sony Music. She is best known for writing and featuring on Loick Essien's single "How We Roll" which peaked at No. 2 on the UK Singles Chart. Later, Tanya supported Bruno Mars as his sole European support for The Doo-Wops & Hooligans Tour. In 2017 she competed on the Voice UK and made it past the Blind Auditions, joining Team Gavin (Gavin Rossdale). In the second stage of the competition, she was eliminated from Gavin's team, but was 'stolen' by Will (will.i.am).

Music career

2011–13: Head Chef
She began her musical career after featuring on rapper Tinchy Stryder's song "Spotlight" on his second album, Catch 22. She featured on, and wrote Loick Essien's single "How We Roll" which was released on 3 July 2011. It peaked at number 2 on the UK Singles Chart and number 49 on the Irish Singles Chart. On 2 December 2011, she released her debut single "Letter to My Ex / Born to Fly". She released her song "Greatness" on 22 July 2012 as the lead single from her EP Head Chef. On 7 October 2012 she released "Too Many Cooks" as the second single from her EP Head Chef. On 22 October 2012 she released her debut EP Head Chef. Lacey made three appearances on renowned drum and bass artist Danny Byrd's third studio album Golden Ticket: "Bad Monday", "Love You Like This" and "Golden Ticket". On 9 June 2013 she released the single "Now That You're Gone".

2014–present
Tanya featured on Matrix & Futurebound's single "Don't Look Back", which was released on 6 July 2014. The song became a Top 40 hit charting at No. 38.

In 2017 Tanya became a competitor on The Voice UK and joined Gavin Rossdale's Team.

Discography

Extended plays

Singles

As featured artist

References

1986 births
Living people
English women pop singers
Musicians from Bristol
21st-century English women singers
21st-century English singers